The 1982 Florida State Seminoles football team represented Florida State University in the 1982 NCAA Division I-A football season. The team was coached by Bobby Bowden and played their home games at Doak Campbell Stadium.

Schedule

References

Florida State
Florida State Seminoles football seasons
Gator Bowl champion seasons
Florida State Seminoles football